Major General Julian Howard Atherden Thompson,  (born 7 October 1934) is a military historian and former Royal Marines officer who commanded 3 Commando Brigade during the Falklands War.

Early life
Thompson was born on 7 October 1934 to Major A. J. Thompson  and Mary Stearns Thompson (née Krause). He was educated at Sherborne School, an all-boys public school in Dorset.

Military career
Thompson joined the Royal Marines in 1952. Between 1954 and 1969, he served in 40, 42, 43, 45 Commandos Royal Marines. During the 1960s he was deployed to Borneo for the Indonesia–Malaysia confrontation. He was promoted to major at the end of 1968, and to lieutenant colonel at the start of 1975. He was appointed commanding officer of 40 Commando in 1975, and commanded it for two and a half years. He was promoted to colonel in mid-1978, and later to brigadier and appointed as commander of 3 Commando Brigade in 1981. Thompson commanded 3 Commando Brigade in the 1982 Falklands War. Promoted to major general, he served as commander of the Training Reserve Forces and Special Forces RM from 1983 to 1986. He retired in 1986.

Later life
In retirement he has written extensively on British military history.  His first book, No Picnic was published in 1985, whilst he was still serving in the Royal Marines.

From 1987 to 1997, he was a senior research fellow in "logistics and armed conflict in the modern age" at King's College, University of London. He has been a visiting professor at the Department of War Studies of King's since 1997.

Thompson is the Chairman of Veterans for Britain, an organization with the aim to "put forward the defence and security arguments for the UK to vote to leave the European Union" and following the referendum to "support Her Majesty's Government in the task of restoring full sovereign control to all aspects of the defence of the realm in accordance with that mandate of the people".

Selected works

  This is a revised version of No Picnic (1985)

Honours and awards 
June 1978: OBE
October 1982: Companion of the Order of the Bath (CB)

References

External links

 Imperial War Museum Interview from 1992

|-

1934 births
Living people
People educated at Sherborne School
Royal Marines generals
Royal Navy personnel of the Falklands War
British historians
Academics of King's College London
Officers of the Order of the British Empire
Companions of the Order of the Bath
British military writers
British military historians